"Lifestyles of the Rich and Famous" is a song written by Benji Madden, Joel Madden and Tim Armstrong for Good Charlotte's second studio album The Young and the Hopeless. It was released as the first single from the album in August 2002 and was the band's debut European single. Upon its release, the single reached a peak of number 20 on the US Billboard Hot 100 (their highest on that chart) and charted within the top 40 in several European countries, Australia, and New Zealand.

Background and writing
The basic concept of the song is the global obsession with fame and the way that celebrities are not appreciative of how fortunate they are.

The lyrics refer to a number of celebrities. Johnnie Cochran, a famous attorney who represented (amongst others) stars such as O. J. Simpson, who was acquitted of murdering his ex-wife Nicole Brown. He is mentioned in the lines "Well did you know when you're famous you could kill your wife / and there's no such thing as 25 to life / as long as you got the cash to pay for Cochran." A former mayor of Washington, D.C., Marion Barry – who was convicted on drug charges – is also mentioned in the lyrics: "and did you know if you were caught and you were smokin' crack / McDonald's wouldn't even wanna take you back / you could always just run for mayor of D.C."

Music video
The music video features cameo appearances from Tenacious D's Kyle Gass, former 'N Sync singer Chris Kirkpatrick, and Minutemen bassist Mike Watt. All three musicians appear in the courtroom scene - Gass plays the prosecutor while Kirkpatrick plays the witness "Chadwick Merryweather Hardy III". Watt plays the Jury foreman. The dog questioned in the video is Benji & Joel's dog, Ca$hdogg. The Southern California rock band Lefty, who had been touring with Good Charlotte also make a cameo appearance. This video premiered in September 2002 on MTV.

Charts

Weekly charts

Year-end charts

Certifications

Release history

In popular culture
 The song was heard in the 2003 film Dickie Roberts: Former Child Star.
 A version of the song was used as the theme music for the Glenn Beck Program early in the 2004 presidential election season, but due to political differences with Good Charlotte, Beck was forced to replace the song with an edited version of Rage Against the Machine's "Killing in the Name".
 "Lifestyles of the Rich and Famous" was heard on an episode of the American television show Drake & Josh in 2004, when Drake and Josh turned on the radio in their dune buggy, and the song's chorus was playing. 
 Parody band Apologetix produced a version on the song based on the events in Luke Chapter 16 in the Bible, named "Lifestyles of the Rich & Nameless".

Awards
"Lifestyles of the Rich and Famous" won the "Viewer's Choice Award" at the MTV Video Music Awards in 2003. It also won the Kerrang! Award for Best Single.

References

External links
 Lifestyles of the Rich and Famous on Sony Musicbox
 

2002 singles
2002 songs
Daylight Records singles
Epic Records singles
Good Charlotte songs
Song recordings produced by Eric Valentine
Songs written by Benji Madden
Songs written by Joel Madden